The following radio stations broadcast on FM frequency 105.5 Hz:

Argentina
 Antena 7 in Las Lajitas, Salta
 Atractiva in Presidencia de la Plaza, Chaco
 Balcarce Salta in Salta
 Cielo in Córdoba
 Concierto in Concepción, Tucumán
 del lago Esquel in Esquel, Chubut
 FM9 in Santa Fe de la Vera Cruz, Santa Fe
 LRM877 Hit in Pilar, Santa Fe
 Inolvidable in Mar del Plata, Buenos Aires
 Los 40 Principales in Buenos Aires
 Norte in Bahía Blanca, Buenos Aires
 Patagonia Madryn in Puerto Madryn, Chubut
 Pop in San Bernardo, Buenos Aires
 Radio 2 in Jujuy
 Red TL in Rosario, Santa Fe
 Villa Santa Rosa in Villa Santa Rosa, Córdoba
 Total in Junín de los Andes, Neuquén

Australia
 2CSF in Coffs Harbour, New South Wales
 3REG in Sale, Victoria
 ABC Classic FM in Ballarat, Victoria
 ABC NewsRadio in Rockhampton, Queensland
 Rox FM in Roxby Downs, South Australia
 SBS Radio in Canberra, Australian Capital Territory
 Triple J in Townsville, Queensland; Adelaide, South Australia; and Smithton, Tasmania

Canada (Channel 288)
 CFMT-FM in Mt-Tremblant, Québec
 CBEF-2-FM in Windsor, Ontario
 CBKK-FM in Patuanak, Saskatchewan
 CBKS-FM in Saskatoon, Saskatchewan
 CFBK-FM in Huntsville, Ontario
 CFIN-FM-2 in Saint-Malachie, Quebec
 CFIN-FM-3 in Saint-Anselme, Quebec
 CFIN-FM-4 in Saint-Jean-d'Orleans, Quebec
 CHRY-FM in Toronto, Ontario
 CHUB-FM in Red Deer, Alberta
 CHXX-FM-1 in Ste-Croix-de-Lotbiniere, Quebec
 CIAM-FM-19 in Prespatou, British Columbia
 CICY-FM in Selkirk, Manitoba
 CJFW-FM-7 in Houston, British Columbia
 CKGS-FM in La Baie, Quebec
 CKLD-FM in Thetford-Mines, Quebec
 CKQK-FM in Charlottetown, Prince Edward Island
 VF2292 in Carol Lake Mining, Newfoundland and Labrador
 VF2360 in Carcross, Yukon

France
 France Info: several locations including the Eiffel Tower at Paris

Indonesia
 RRI Batam Pro-2 in Batam and Singapore

Ireland
Today FM

Malaysia
 Zayan in Kuala Terengganu, Terengganu (Coming Soon)

Mexico
 XHAGR-FM in Acapulco, Guerrero
XHAKUM-FM in Akumal, Quintana Roo
XHARI-FM in Nacozari, Sonora
XHATL-FM in Atlacomulco, Estado de México
XHBO-FM in San José de la Sonaja, Guanajuato
 XHCMS-FM in Mexicali, Baja California
 XHFCE-FM in Huayacocotla, Veracruz
 XHHE-FM in Atotonilco El Alto, Jalisco
 XHHIT-FM in Puebla, Puebla
 XHHZ-FM in La Paz, Baja California Sur
XHIE-FM in Matehuala, San Luis Potosí
XHOBA-FM in Orizaba, Veracruz
 XHPCAN-FM in Candelaria, Campeche
XHPECO-FM in Ciudad Frontera, Coahuila
XHPET-FM in Peto, Yucatán
 XHRE-FM in Piedras Negras, Coahuila
 XHSCED-FM in Morelia, Michoacán
 XHTIO-FM in Tampico, Tamaulipas
XHUGA-FM in Ameca, Jalisco

Philippines
DWAA in San Fernando City, La Union
DWDU in Clark Freeport Zone
DYMY in Bacolod City
DWRG-FM in Naga City

United Kingdom
 Swindon 105.5 in Swindon, England
 Secklow Sounds in Milton Keynes, England
Warminster Community Radio (WCR)

United States (Channel 288)
  in Andrews, Texas
 KAGF-LP in Twin Falls, Idaho
 KAIZ in Avondale, Arizona
  in Deer River, Minnesota
 KBKK in Ball, Louisiana
 KBOA-FM in Piggott, Arkansas
  in Long Beach, California
 KCGB-FM in Hood River, Oregon
 KCMZ in Ozona, Texas
  in Albany, Minnesota
 KDDK in Addis, Louisiana
  in Garibaldi, Oregon
  in Perry, Iowa
 KEBL-LP in Sulphur, Louisiana
 KESM-FM in El Dorado Springs, Missouri
 KEUG in Veneta, Oregon
  in Eunice, Louisiana
 KFAC-LP in Twisp, Washington
  in Fremont, Nebraska
  in Ojai, California
  in Stillwater, Oklahoma
 KGIC-LP in Corona, California
 KHFN-LP in Nazareth, Texas
  in Mount Pleasant, Iowa
 KIMW in Heflin, Louisiana
  in Timnath, Colorado
  in Eureka, California
  in Saint Joseph, Missouri
 KKKJ in Merrill, Oregon
  in Chanute, Kansas
 KLCY in Vernal, Utah
 KLHB in Portland, Texas
  in Mayville, North Dakota
 KMGM in Montevideo, Minnesota
 KMOM in Roscoe, South Dakota
  in Nashville, Arkansas
 KPFM in Mountain Home, Arkansas
  in Haliimaile, Hawaii
 KQLJ-LP in Roundup, Montana
 KQRI in Bosque Farms, New Mexico
 KQXX-FM in Mission, Texas
  in Saint Peter, Minnesota
  in Security, Colorado
 KRIX in Port Isabel, Texas
 KRMI-LP in Manhattan, Kansas
  in Copperopolis, California
  in Dunnigan, California
 KSJG-LP in Lewistown, Montana
 KSNX in Heber, Arizona
 KSXM-LP in Salem, Oregon
 KSZX in Santa Anna, Texas
  in Idaho Falls, Idaho
 KTRZ in Taos, New Mexico
 KUKN in Longview, Washington
 KUPO-LP in Port Orford, Oregon
 KUSJ in Harker Heights, Texas
 KVSV-FM in Beloit, Kansas
 KVVS in Rosamond, California
  in Stuttgart, Arkansas
 KWBB-LP in Big Bear Lake, California
 KWCO-FM in Chickasha, Oklahoma
 KWDO in San Joaquin, California
 KWRF-FM in Warren, Arkansas
 KXCS in Coahoma, Texas
 KXFC in Coalgate, Oklahoma
 KXRU-LP in Portland, Oregon
  in Danville, Arkansas
 KYGS-LP in Nipomo, California
 KZOB-FM in O'Brien, Texas
 KZQL in Mills, Wyoming
  in Moberly, Missouri
 WABO-FM in Waynesboro, Mississippi
 WBHU in Saint Augustine Beach, Florida
  in Bethlehem, West Virginia
  in West Branch, Michigan
 WBNT-FM in Oneida, Tennessee
  in Naples Park, Florida
  in Islesboro, Maine
  in Clemson, South Carolina
  in Washington Court Hou, Ohio
  in Lewistown, Pennsylvania
  in Kiawah Island, South Carolina
 WCXX-LP in Cincinnati, Ohio
  in Monticello, Illinois
  in Darlington, South Carolina
 WDBA-LP in Farmingdale, New York
  in Patterson, New York
  in Dover, New Jersey
 WDMB-LP in Queens, New York
  in New Port Richey, Florida
 WERC-FM in Hoover, Alabama
  in Trempealeau, Wisconsin
  in Apalachicola, Florida
  in Aguada, Puerto Rico
  in Sanford, North Carolina
  in Gladstone, Michigan
  in Conneaut, Ohio
  in Richlands, Virginia
 WHFK-LP in Red Oak, North Carolina
 WHLQ in Lawrenceville, Virginia
  in Jesup, Georgia
 WINC-FM in Berryville, Virginia
 WIRI in Nekoosa, Wisconsin
 WJFU-LP in White Springs, Florida
 WJKG in Altamont, Illinois
  in South Jacksonville, Illinois
  in Concord, New Hampshire
  in Altavista, Virginia
  in Cowen, West Virginia
  in Saint Johnsbury, Vermont
  in Greenville, Kentucky
  in Valparaiso, Indiana
 WLPN-LP in Chicago, Illinois
  in Lake Placid, New York
 WLSW in Salisbury, Maryland
  in Fort Knox, Kentucky
 WLXF in Macon, Georgia
 WMGH-FM in Tamaqua, Pennsylvania
 WMKD in Pickford, Michigan
  in Brookville, Pennsylvania
  in Verona, Wisconsin
  in Sidney, Ohio
 WNJH in Cape May Court House, New Jersey
 WNPD-LP in Nantucket, Massachusetts
  in Bay Minette, Alabama
 WOJL in Louisa, Virginia
 WOLL in Hobe Sound, Florida
 WQEQ-LP in Flushing, New York
  in Groton, Connecticut
 WQHU-LP in Huntington, Indiana
 WQLJ in Water Valley, Mississippi
 WQQO in Sylvania, Ohio
 WQRK in Bedford, Indiana
  in Tappahannock, Virginia
  in Metropolis, Illinois
 WRQR-FM in Paris, Tennessee
 WRXJ-LP in Winooski, Vermont
  in Rossville, Georgia
  in Gatlinburg, Tennessee
 WSFT-LP in Berrien Springs, Michigan
  in Little Falls, New York
  in Honor, Michigan
 WSSQ in Sterling, Illinois
  in Pennington Gap, Virginia
  in Lagrange, Indiana
 WTKV in Minetto, New York
 WTMS-LP in Kissimmee, Florida
 WVBG-FM in Redwood, Mississippi
 WVIG in West Terre Haute, Indiana
  in Muscle Shoals, Alabama
  in Flint, Michigan
  in Easthampton, Massachusetts
 WWWK in Islamorada, Florida
  in Jacksonville, North Carolina
  in Athens, Ohio
  in Wilmington, Illinois
 WYRL-LP in Rice Lake, Wisconsin
 WYTM-FM in Fayetteville, Tennessee
  in Mary Esther, Florida
 WZBN (FM) in Camilla, Georgia
 WZNN in Mount Sterling, Kentucky
  in Woodstock, Illinois

References

Lists of radio stations by frequency